We Shall Not Flag Or Fail, We Shall Go On to the End is the first full-length album by accordion singer-songwriter Geoff Berner.

It was released in 2003, in Canadian and US territories.

Track listing
All lyrics/music by G. Berner unless otherwise stated.

 Volcano God
 Clown and Bard
 We All Gotta Be a Prostitute Sometimes
 Maginot Line
 In the Year 2020 (Carmaig de Forest)
 Porn Queen Girlfriend
 A Settling of Accounts
 Beautiful in my Eyes
 The Way That Girl Drinks Beer
 Iron Grey

Trivia
"We shall not flag or fail, we shall go on to the end" is a quote by Winston Churchill. An old World War II poster with the words on it and a picture of Churchill can be seen in the background of the album's liner notes.
In the background of the liner notes of the album, a postcard to Berner from Norway, featuring the logo of Norway's popular Joika sami meatballs, can be seen.
Diona Davies (of Po' Girl) did not actually play the violin on this album; she started to tour with Geoff after the album's release.

2003 albums
Geoff Berner albums